Tungamull is a rural locality in the Livingstone Shire, Queensland, Australia. In the  Tungamull had a population of 443 people.

Geography 
The north of the locality has rural residential properties with some other pockets of rural residential properties in the south-east of the locality. Most of the locality is used for grazing on native vegetation.

The Rockhampton–Emu Park Road runs through from south to north.

History 
In the  Tungamull had a population of 443 people.

References 

Shire of Livingstone
Localities in Queensland